Elisabeth Sadoulet is an economist and Professor of Agricultural and Resource Economics at the University of California, Berkeley who has carried out field research in China, India, Latin America, and sub-Saharan Africa. Sadoulet was the editor of the World Bank Economic Review from 2010 to 2013, and is a fellow of several scholarly associations in the fields of agriculture and economics.

Sadoulet has worked in an advisory capacity with organizations including the Government of Mexico, the Food and Agriculture Organization of the United Nations (FAO), and the World Bank. She is a senior fellow at the Fondation pour les études et recherches sur le développement international (FERDI).

Career
Sadoulet obtained her PhD from the University of Geneva in 1982, after studying mathematics and econometrics.
In 1985, she joined the University of California, Berkeley as a Lecturer where she has remained. Along with agronomist and economist Alain de Janvry, whom she met at UC Berkeley, Sadoulet is one of a small number of French economists working in the United States.

Sadoulet was the editor of the World Bank Economic Review from 2010 to 2013, and on the editorial board of the Review of Agricultural and Environmental Studies from 2008 to 2010.

Research 
Sadoulet's research mainly focuses on agricultural economics. She names Angus Deaton, Irma Adelman, Abhijit Banerjee and Esther Duflo as having influenced her approach to economics as both a quantitative and experimental discipline, in which rigorous analysis became the basis for policy recommendations in normative work with governments, organizations, NGOs, and the private sector.

Throughout her career, she has focused on "how to make agriculture into an effective instrument for development", believing that it is underused and misused, but still presents unique opportunities. Beginning with a focus on growth and poverty, her work includes vulnerability to poverty and risk, inequality and inequity, basic needs in health and education, access to assets, microfinancing,  land rental contracts, technology innovation, social programs, community-driven development, adaptation to climate change, resource scarcity, cooperative management of common property resources, and governance.

Sadoulet has published the textbooks Quantitative development policy analysis (1995, 2003) and Development Economics: Theory and practice (2016, 2021) with Alain De Janvry.  

Sadoulet has published in The American Economic Review (AER), The Economic Journal (EJ), the Journal of Development Economics (JDE), World Development (WD), and the Annual Review of Resource Economics.  Sadoulet is ranked #472 in the top 5% of the most prolific economists in the world, with 288 publications listed on IDEAS.
Her works have been cited over 28,492 times on Google Scholar.

Awards
Sadoulet became an honorary life member of the International Association of Agricultural Economists in 2018.  She became a fellow of the American Association of Agricultural Economics in 2011. She is also a fellow of the Agricultural & Applied Economics Association (AAEA). 

Sadoulet has been recognized by the AAEA for her research, her teaching and her advisory work in the area of international economic development. Sadoulet received the College of Natural Resources (CNR) Distinguished Teaching Award in 2016. She was a recipient of the Publication of Enduring Quality Award at the AAEA & WAEA Joint Annual Meeting in 2021.

Selected publications

References

External links 
 

Living people
Year of birth missing (living people)
American women economists
University of California, Berkeley faculty
University of Geneva alumni
21st-century American economists
20th-century American economists
20th-century American women
21st-century American women